Kaun Sachcha Kaun Jhootha is a 1997 Hindi-language thriller film which was released on 11 April 1997. The film was directed by Partho Ghosh. It starred Rishi Kapoor and Sridevi.

Plot 

A plainclothes police officer, Karan Saxena (Rishi Kapoor), is assigned the task of apprehending the killer of a fellow officer, which was committed by a woman named Madhu Mathur (Sridevi). With the help of IG Suryakant Verma, he is able to successfully apprehend her, and also has a taped confession from her. Instead of closing the file, he finds himself intrigued by Madhu, and does a little bit more research in her case, and find himself in love with her. Despite of his efforts Madhu is sentenced to death. He helps her escape and seeks the help of IG Suryakant Verma and the state's Chief Minister (Aloknath), but instead finds out the police have launched a man-hunt for him and Madhu. He finds out that this case is not as simple as he thought it was, and it involves a lot of people in power, including his friends. He also has to face a mysterious adversary who follows him everywhere, and both he and Madhu have absolutely no clue as to what is going to happen.

Cast
Rishi Kapoor as CBI Officer Karan Saxena
Sridevi as  Madhu Mathur / Dr. Sapna Mathur
Suresh Oberoi as IG Suryakant Verma
Mohnish Behl as Manish Rawat 
Gulshan Grover as K. Kaushal (guest appearance)
Tinnu Anand as Ramu Kaka 	
Alok Nath as Deepak Seth Chief Minister
Aashif Sheikh as John D'Souza

Soundtrack 
All songs were composed by Rajesh Roshan and lyrics were penned by Sameer.
Dr.Alban's "Mata oh" music has been used in the song "Chanchal Hawao Si" .

"Adha Chand Adhi Raat" - Jyoti
"Chanchal Hawaon Se" - Alka Yagnik
"Chhal Kiya Tu" - Udit Narayan, Preeti Uttam 
"Dil Se Judi Dil" - Kumar Sanu, Alka Yagnik 
"Hum Do Deewane" - Abhijeet Bhattacharya, Kavita Krishnamurthy 
"Vaadon Ki Suhaani Shaam" - Kumar Sanu, Kavita Krishnamurthy

References

External links
 
 

1990s Hindi-language films
1997 films
Indian thriller films
Films scored by Rajesh Roshan
1997 thriller films
Films directed by Partho Ghosh
Hindi-language thriller films